Tamplin is a surname. Notable people with the surname include:

Bill Tamplin (1917–1989), Welsh rugby union player
Cyril Tamplin (1920–2006), Welsh cricketer
Glenn Tamplin (born 1972), English businessman and football club chairman
Henry Tamplin (1801–1867), English businessman
Ken Tamplin (born 1963), American musician